Natasha Gregson Wagner ( Gregson; born September 29, 1970) is an American actress. She is the daughter of film producer Richard Gregson and actress Natalie Wood. She has appeared in films including Lost Highway (1997), Two Girls and a Guy (1997), First Love, Last Rites (1997), Urban Legend (1998), Another Day in Paradise (1998) and High Fidelity (2000).

Early life
Natasha Gregson was born September 29, 1970 in Los Angeles, to American actress Natalie Wood and British producer Richard Gregson. Her godmother was actress Ruth Gordon. Her parents separated when she was ten months old, and later divorced. Her mother remarried actor Robert Wagner in 1972, and in 1974 they had a daughter, Courtney. Her aunt, with whom she has no contact, is actress and producer Lana Wood. Through her father, she is a cousin of author Jessica Gregson, niece of actor Michael Craig, stepdaughter of journalist Julia Gregson and great-great granddaughter of Reginald Hanson, former Lord Mayor of London. She is distantly related by marriage to baseball player Tim Lincecum on her mother's side.

On November 29, 1981, Natalie Wood drowned near Santa Catalina Island. After her mother's death, Gregson Wagner and her half-sister were raised in California by Wagner and actress Jill St. John.

Gregson Wagner attended Crossroads School in Santa Monica. She went on to Emerson College and later transferred to the University of Southern California. She left in 1992 to pursue an acting career.

Career 
Gregson Wagner's first film role was as Lisa in the 1992 crime drama film Fathers & Sons. She then had a small role in the movie Buffy the Vampire Slayer. Following that film she starred in several TV movies including Modern Vampires, Hefner: Unauthorized, and The Shaggy Dog. In 1995, she starred with her stepfather Robert Wagner in a Hart to Hart TV movie. She starred in the Wes Craven horror film Mind Ripper. In 1996, she co-starred with Jon Lovitz and Tia Carrere in the comedy High School High. She played Lou in the 1997 film Two Girls and a Guy. Gregson Wagner played a small role in the 1998 thriller Urban Legend. That same year she guest starred in an episode of Ally McBeal and co-starred with Vincent Kartheiser, James Woods and Melanie Griffith in Larry Clark's crime drama Another Day in Paradise. To avoid an NC-17 rating, a rough sex scene with Kartheiser had to be removed from the theatrical version.

In 2000, Gregson Wagner had roles in Stranger Than Fiction, and High Fidelity opposite John Cusack. In 2001, she was regular cast member in the short-lived prime time soap opera, Pasadena. In 2003, she played Barbara Richardson in the movie Wonderland. In 2004, she had a role in the Hallmark movie, Angel in the Family playing the part of Beth. In 2005 Gregson Wagner guest-starred on Cold Case and Medium. In 2006, she starred in two episodes of ER: "Bloodline" and "21 Guns". From 2005 to 2007, she had a recurring role on the TV show The 4400 as April Skouris, the sister of NTAC agent Diana Skouris. In 2008, she guest starred on CSI: Crime Scene Investigation and House M.D.

In 2020, Gregson Wagner produced the documentary film Natalie Wood: What Remains Behind, directed by Laurent Bouzereau.

Personal life
From 1990 to 1997, Gregson Wagner dated Josh Evans, son of Ali MacGraw and Robert Evans. She was married to screenwriter D.V. DeVincentis from October 2003 to January 2008.

On May 30, 2012, Gregson Wagner and actor Barry Watson had a daughter, Clover Clementyne Watson. The couple married in December 2014.

Filmography

Film

Television

References

External links 
 

1970 births
21st-century American actresses
American film actresses
American television actresses
American people of English descent
American people of Russian descent
Living people
Actresses from Los Angeles
Crossroads School alumni